Obayashi may refer to:

Obayashi Corporation, one of five major Japanese construction companies
Obayashi (surname), a Japanese surname
Obayashi Station, a railway station in Takarazuka, Hyōgo Prefecture, Japan